Rubus stipulatus is a North American species of bristleberry in section Setosi of the genus Rubus, a member of the rose family. It is endemic to small areas of the Great Lakes in the north-central United States (Minnesota, Wisconsin, Michigan, Iowa) and Ontario, Canada.

References

External links 

stipulatus
Plants described in 1947
Flora of the Great Lakes region (North America)